Scott Murrell (born 5 September 1985) is a retired English rugby league footballer who played as a  or  in the Super League for Leeds Rhinos,  London Broncos and  Hull Kingston Rovers , in the Betfred Championship for Halifax, and for Keighley Cougars in League One.

He played at representative level for Great Britain (Academy) touring Australia. 

On 4 August 2020, it was announced that Murrell would join Keighley Cougars for the 2021 season  After two seasons with Keighley, Murrell announced in August 2022 that he was retiring from playing at the end of the 2022 season.

At the end of the 2022 season Murrell joined Keighley's coaching team but left in December 2022 to become assistant coach at Castleford Tigers where as well as being assistant to Lee Radford he will be the reserves head coach.

Background
Scott Murrell was born in Leeds, West Yorkshire, England. He is the son of the rugby league footballer; Bryan Murrell.

References

1985 births
Living people
English rugby league players
Halifax R.L.F.C. players
Hull Kingston Rovers players
Leeds Rhinos players
London Broncos players
Keighley Cougars players
Rugby league five-eighths
Rugby league halfbacks
Rugby league hookers
Rugby league locks
Rugby league players from Leeds